(The Circus Princess) is an operetta in three acts by Hungarian composer Emmerich Kálmán to a German libretto by Julius Brammer and Alfred Grünwald. It premiered at the Theater an der Wien in Vienna on 26 March 1926 and went on to 344 performances there.

Synopsis

The plot revolves around a romantic intrigue with interpolated circus sequences. The mysterious "Mister X", a dashing circus performer, is hired by a disappointed suitor of Princess Fedora Palinska to pose as a nobleman and marry her. "Mister X" is in fact a nobleman, the disinherited nephew of a deceased prince. One of the work's most well-known arias,  (Two fairy-tale eyes), has been recorded by several famous tenors, including Fritz Wunderlich, Charles Kullman, and Richard Tauber.

International productions

The operetta was swiftly performed in Hungary, in an adaptation by Ernő Kulinyi and Imre Liptai, at the Király Színház in Budapest, on 24 September 1926. Productions in Sweden (Stockholm, Vasa-Teatern, October 6, 1926); Germany (Hamburg, Operetten-Teater, October 17, 1926), and - as Mister X - in Russia (Moscow, November 23, 1926). There were also productions during 1926 in Czechoslovakia, Italy, Finland and Poland.

An English language version, The Circus Princess, adapted by Harry B. Smith - first seen at the Apollo Theatre, Atlantic City, on April 4, 1927 - enjoyed a successful run at the Winter Garden Theatre in New York City from 25 April 1927 starring Guy Robertson and Desiree Tabor. The circus sequences in the American production were particularly lavish, including equestrians, aerialists, and a famous clown of the day, Poodles Hanneford. The show was staged by J. C. Huffman.

Roles

Recordings
Emmerich Kálmán: Die Zirkusprinzessin – Margit Schramm (soprano), Guggi Löwinger (soprano), Julius Katona (tenor), Rudolf Schock (tenor), Ferry Gruber (tenor); Deutsche Oper Berlin (chorus); Berliner Symphoniker (orchestra); Robert Stolz (conductor), Label: Eurodisc.

Films
Several  films have been made, including The Circus Princess in 1925, Mister X in 1958 and The Circus Princess in 1982.

Notes and references

 
 Martin, Jessie Wright (2005) A Survey of the Operettas of Emmerich Kalman, PhD. Thesis: Louisiana State University, August 2005.
 Naxos Records, Liner Notes, The Best of Operetta Vol. 2.
 Smith, Cecil (1981) Musical Comedy in America: From the Black Crook Through Sweeney Todd Routledge. 
 Traubner, Richard (2003) Operetta: A Theatrical History, Routledge. 

Operas by Emmerich Kálmán
Hungarian music
German-language operettas
1926 operas
Operas adapted into films